The New York City Police Foundation was established in 1971 by business and civic leaders as a nonprofit tax-exempt charity that could raise money to spend on projects supporting NYPD reform and modernization efforts as well as helping improve its relationship with the broader New York City community. The NYCPF was the first municipal foundation of its type in the country.

The NYCPF public-private partnership provides the New York City Police Department with the means to launch experimental programs. The Foundation supported Commissioner Raymond W. Kelly's efforts to establish the Real Time Crime Center.

Since its founding, the NYCPF has raised more than $120 million on behalf of the NYPD from the city’s power elite. However, critics have claimed that the NYPD has been unduly influenced by a $4.6 million gift from JP Morgan, via the New York City Police Foundation, that funded patrol car laptops as well as security monitoring devices.

References

External links 
 NYCPF official site
 Local Police Foundations in the U.S.

New York City Police Department
Organizations based in New York City
1971 establishments in New York City